The 1970 South American Basketball Championship for Women was the 13th iteration of the tournament, which was hosted in Guayaquil, Ecuador. The winners were Brazil, who won their sixth title to date and fourth consecutive title.

Tournament 
The tournament was held in a single round robin format among the eight competing teams. Brazil won all seven of their games. The change in teams from the previous tournament was the return of the Colombian team after missing the previous tournament, as well as the Venezuelan team.

Results

Games

References

South
B
South American Basketball Championship for Women
September 1970 sports events in South America
October 1970 sports events in South America
1970 in Brazilian sport
1970 in Argentine sport
1970 in Ecuadorian sport
1970 in Chilean sport
1970 in Peruvian sport
1970 in Colombian sport
1970 in Venezuelan sport